Bartolomeo Traballesi (active 1560, died 1585) was an Italian painter active in Florence, Italy in a Mannerist style.

He was one of the painters engaged for the decoration of the Studiolo of Francesco I Medici in the Palazzo Vecchio of Florence.

References

Year of birth unknown
1585 deaths
16th-century Italian painters
Italian male painters
Painters from Florence
Mannerist painters